Sherry Chris is president and CEO of  Expansion Brands Portfolio at Realogy Holdings Corporation, which includes Better Homes and Gardens Real Estate, and ERA, divisions of Realogy Corporation.

Education
Chris is a graduate of The University of Western Ontario and earned an MBA from the Ivey School of Business. She became interested in real estate and started as a real estate agent with her first home sale in 1982.

Career
Chris started her career in the banking industry and moved into real estate in 1982 in the province of Ontario, Canada. She began working with Royal LePage in 1987 as a branch and area manager. In 1997, she was promoted to regional manager and held a vice-president position in Toronto. Chris was eventually promoted to Executive Vice President of Network Services. In 2003 Chris became the President of Real Living Network Services, where she worked until 2005, when she joined Prudential California Realty as Chief Operations Officer (COO). In December 2006, Chris joined Realogy Corporation (“Realogy”) as the Chief Operating Officer of Coldwell Banker Real Estate LLC.  In the position Chris would “direct the company's operations, education, mortgage and field services programs [and] ... focus on communication between Coldwell Banker corporate headquarters, regional offices and its nearly 4,000-office affiliate network." In October 2007, Realogy Corporation entered into a 100-year agreement to license the Better Homes and Gardens brand from Meredith Corporation. In 2008, Realogy launched a franchise network for the Better Homes and Gardens Real Estate LLC brand, of which Chris was named CEO and president. Since the franchise's launch, Chris has grown the Better Homes and Gardens Real Estate network to represent the fifth largest residential brand for Realogy, expanding it to hundreds of offices and thousands of affiliated sales associates in the United States and Canada.

In September 2019 Chris was named president and chief executive officer of Realogy Expansion Brands Portfolio which includes Better Homes and Gardens® Real Estate and ERA Real Estate.

Recognition
Chris was named the 2010 and 2015  Inman Innovator of the Year in the real estate industry and has also been included in Inman's “100 Most Influential Real Estate Leaders” for seven consecutive years. She was included on the Most Influential Real Estate Executives list by Real Estate Executive Magazine and Profiles in Diversity Journal's annual Women Worth Watching list. In 2010 Chris won the Stevie Award for Best Executive in the Stevie Awards for Women in Business. In October 2015, Chris won the National Association of Gay & Lesbian Real Estate Professionals (NAGLREP) Pinnacle Award created for leaders who have advanced a climate of acceptance that benefits LGBT home buyers & sellers. Chris was included in the Swanepoel Power 200 list from 2013 to present. Chris was also named to the 2021 RISMedia Hall of Fame.

Other work 
Chris has been a guest author on Huffington Post, and has been featured on national media outlets such as the FOX Business Channel, CNBC, The New York Times, The Wall Street Journal, and USA Today.

In 2016, Pantone made a custom color for Chris, SC2011 which is a shade of bright pink.

In 2017, Chris was on a Feng Shui Lifestyle  panel of The Milken Institute's Global Conference.

References

Year of birth missing (living people)
American women chief executives
Living people
University of Western Ontario alumni
21st-century American women